Golemi Dol is a village located in the municipality of Preševo, Serbia. According to the 2002 census, the village has a population of 294 people. Of these, 266 (90,47 %) were ethnic Albanians, and 28 (9,52 %) were Serbs.

References

Populated places in Pčinja District
Albanian communities in Serbia